Leftöver Crack is an American punk rock band formed in 1998, following the breakup of Choking Victim. The band is currently signed to Tankcrimes for CD releases, and Alternative Tentacles for vinyl releases. Leftöver Crack spans several different music genres including hardcore punk, ska, and crust punk. They write mostly political lyrics of a radical leftist nature, opposing religion, capitalism, and authority. Members of Leftöver Crack reside in the C-Squat on 155 Avenue C in the Lower East Side of Manhattan. Natives of New York City, band members have a well-documented history of back-and-forth conflict with the NYPD which precedes the band's formation. The name "Leftöver Crack" is explained by Stza as being "an oxymoron", based on the idea that crack cocaine addicts are known for vigorous use and are unlikely to have any "leftover" crack.

History

Beginnings
Formed around the same time as the breakup of Choking Victim, Leftöver Crack was initially an outlet for Choking Victim frontman Scott Sturgeon a.k.a. Stza to release songs that, for one reason or another, were never recorded by Choking Victim and which he claims are the "Leftover songs"—hence the name.  For almost two years following the band's formation, the band consisted almost solely of Stza, who recorded many of the songs that would feature on later releases onto a four-track recorder whilst searching for band members. The band eventually solidified (albeit temporarily) around a lineup of Scott "Stza" Sturgeon (vocals, additional guitars), Brad Logan of F-Minus (guitar), Alec Baillie (bass, previously of Choking Victim), Mike Trujillo of Blindsided (guitar) and Amery "AWOL" Smith (drums, previously of Suicidal Tendencies and the Beastie Boys).

Now a complete band, Leftöver Crack proceeded to record several songs with the full lineup, including "Rock the 40 Oz.", "Crack City Rockers" and "The Good, the Bad & the Leftöver Crack"—effectively the band's "theme song". Five of these songs were later included on the band's first release, Rock the 40 Oz. 7-inch EP, which was released by Bankshot! Records on March 8, 2000.

Signing to Hellcat Records
After contributing the song "Crack City Rockers" to the second installment of Hellcat Records' Give 'em the Boot compilation series, the band was signed to the label, initially being contracted to produce three albums for Hellcat. The band agreed, and promptly began recording songs for their first full-length album, tentatively titled Shoot the Kids at School.

Hellcat Records refused to release the album, due to concerns over the album's controversial title, artwork, and subject matter (especially regarding the recent Columbine shootings). The band eventually relented and changed the album's title, art, and track listing, under the promise that they would be released from their contract afterward as a result. The album was eventually released under the title of Mediocre Generica, a sly attack at Hellcat Records, who Stza claimed wanted a "mediocre, generic" album compared the original. The album was released on September 11, 2001.

At this point, the band now consisted of Stza (vocals, additional guitars), Alec (bass), Ezra, and Ara Babajian from NYC ska band Agent 99, and later The Slackers, on drums.

Split from Hellcat Records and new music
As a result of legal disputes with Hellcat Records, the band was effectively left in limbo for approximately two years, unable to leave their current label, yet also unable to sign to another—as well as being unable to release any new material under the name of Leftöver Crack. However, the band did manage to bend the rules of their contract slightly, releasing a split EP with F-Minus as the Crack Rock Steady Seven—effectively Leftöver Crack working under aliases with additional musicians. The EP was titled Baby Jesus, Sliced up in the Manger and was released on November 27, 2003.

In February 2003, the band began to record the songs that they had written and developed over the last three years with esteemed engineer Steve Albini, a majority of which would see a release on their second album. After recording two final songs that winter, and having finally been dropped from Hellcat Records' roster, the band opted to release the song the following the year as the Fuck World Trade demo for the consideration of independent punk record labels. Around the same time, the band were approached by renowned underground punk rock figure and ex-Dead Kennedys frontman Jello Biafra, and consequently signed to his Alternative Tentacles record label.

Fuck World Trade
On August 30, 2004, Leftöver Crack released their second album, Fuck World Trade, on Alternative Tentacles (Household Name Records in the UK).

The album has been banned in multiple chain stores such as Wal-Mart, Best Buy and Music Land due to the album's controversial name and subject matter—as well as the front cover, which features George W. Bush, Dick Cheney, and Rudy Giuliani (Tony Blair on the UK release) causing the World Trade Center attacks.

The album also displayed a greater degree of artistic freedom from the band, featuring longer songs, a wider range of instrumentation (such as strings, synthesizers and double-bass drumming) and a larger amount of genre experimentation—featuring elements of death metal, classical music and folk music along with the band's trademark combination of anarcho-punk and ska. The album also included several guest appearances, including Chris Head, Justin Sane, and Chris No. 2 of Anti-Flag, as well as a collaboration with The World/Inferno Friendship Society.

Hiatus
The band took an indefinite hiatus after the death of drummer Brandon Possible at the end of 2004. Stza spent the interim playing Leftöver Crack and Choking Victims songs by himself at a few solo acoustic shows. Ezra spent time writing songs for his band Morning Glory. Leftöver Crack began touring again in the summer of 2005, including some dates with Citizen Fish and The World/Inferno Friendship Society, as well as playing dates in October 2005 in California after the Wasted Fest was canceled. The so-called Crack Rock Steady Seven also embarked on a small European tour in November; however, this incarnation consisted of only Stza and The Infested, in some cases billed as the "Crack Steady Rockers".

Return and split with Citizen Fish
Blacknoise Records released a four-way split entitled The Kids Are Gonna Pay... in March 2006 with Leftöver Crack contributing 1 new song, "Look Who's Talking Now". Other bands on the split included Morning Glory, F-Minus, and Bent Outta Shape. The 7-inch was limited to 1000 copies on white vinyl and is now sold out. The first 100 included limited-edition patches designed by Brad Logan's wife Kristen, and some included an insert.

On October 31, 2006, Fat Wreck Chords released a 7-inch split single with UK ska punk band Citizen Fish, to which Leftöver Crack contributed the new song "Baby Punchers". To support the release, the two bands joined with other Fat Wreck bands, The Sainte Catherines and Dead to Me, and went on a U.S. tour. The full-length split with Citizen Fish, entitled Deadline, was released on March 6, 2007, with Fat Wreck Chords releasing the CD version and Alternative Tentacles releasing the vinyl version. The album featured seven songs from each band (plus an intro for Leftöver Crack's side), as well as featuring three songs originally intended to be released by Stza's newer band, Star Fucking Hipsters. 1103 copies were released on white vinyl.

Departure of Ezra and tour of Australia
Following the release and subsequent touring in support of Deadline, Leftöver Crack gradually became less prominent as members (namely Stza and Ezra) focused on other musical projects—such as Star Fucking Hipsters and Morning Glory, respectively. Although still regularly playing shows, the band effectively took a backseat, especially as Star Fucking Hipsters released their first two albums, Until We're Dead and Never Rest in Peace.

Towards the end of 2009, it was announced that longtime guitarist and backing vocalist Ezra had left the band. Although initially appearing to be an amicable departure, this later escalated when Stza effectively began an online "feud" with Ezra, accusing him of being a liar and drug addict.

In November 2009, Leftöver Crack toured Australia and New Zealand for the first time in their career. However, the lineup for all of the shows consisted of Stza, guitarist Frank Piegaro (of Star Fucking Hipsters/Degenerics) and two Australians filling in: Alex Flamsteed (Hereafter) and Chris Cox (Phalanx).

Following the Australian tour, Stza stated at a house show in West Auckland that Leftöver Crack would most probably be inactive in the future, much like Choking Victim before them. This coincided with the increased rate of activity from Star Fucking Hipsters, which has become his main creative outlet as of late.

In December 2010, Leftöver Crack announced that they were playing three shows. Returning to the lineup was Ezra, implying that the feud between him and Stza may have been resolved.

In January 2011, it was announced through their Facebook page that Leftöver Crack would do a West Coast tour in February and an East Coast tour in March of that year. They would also play a small UK tour in August 2011, including the Reading and Leeds festivals.

Constructs of the State

On July 20, 2015, Scott Sturgeon confirmed Leftöver Crack had finished their third album, Constructs of the State. It was released on November 27, 2015, through Fat Wreck Chords, and featured guest appearances from Days N' Daze, Mischief Brew, The Bouncing Souls, Intro5pect, Blackbird Raum, Penny Rimbaud and Jesse Michaels.

On May 25, 2016, the band released a music video for the song "Bedbugs & Beyond" courtesy of Shibby Pictures.

Venue bans, criminal records and visa restriction
Leftöver Crack has been banned from performing in many venues in New York City, such as ABC No Rio and the Knitting Factory. However, they still play at banned venues under a different name, Crack Rock Steady Seven or individually as solo acts. They repeatedly have trouble touring in certain countries, especially Canada, due to members having prior criminal records. They were denied entry into Canada for a tour scheduled at the end of 2007. At a show in Boston, MA in August 2008, Stza angrily stated Leftöver Crack would never return to Boston; however, they played just outside of Boston on June 18, 2016. In 2006, after their show in Boise, Stza announced to a group of fans that they would never return, and Boise was subsequently skipped in '07 and Star Fucking Hipsters' 2010 Boise date was canceled a week or so after being posted, though they returned to Boise in March 2011. In June 2016, Leftöver Crack was allowed entry into Canada and played Amnesia Rockfest in Montebello, Quebec, but had many members denied again in 2018.

Moving to Tankcrimes
It was announced in September 2021 that all Star Fucking Hipsters and Leftöver Crack discography would move from Fat Wreck to Oakland-based record label Tankcrimes. Tankcrimes is a small independent label with bands such as Spazz, Ghoul, Necrot, and punk supergroup Kicker. It is unclear if Never Rest in Peace from Star Fucking Hipsters (which was originally released via Alternative Tentacles) or Mediocre Generica (originally released on Hellcat) would also shift to the Oakland-based record label.

Members
Current
 Stza – lead vocals, keys, guitar (1998–present)
 Donny Morris – drums (2015–present)
 Al Rosenberg – guitar (2019–present)
 Kate Coysh – vocals (2017–present)

Past
 Brad Logan – guitar (1998–2000; 2004–2021)
 Sandra Malak - bass guitar (2021)
 Alec Baillie – bass (1998–2020; died 2020)
 Chris Mann – guitar (2015–2019)
 Amery Smith – drums (1998–2000)
 Mike Trujillo – guitar (1998–2000)
 Brandon Chevalier-Kolling – drums (1998, 2004; died 2004)
 Ezra Kire – guitar (2000–2012)
 Ara Babajian – drums (2000–2002, 2005–2007)
 JP Otto – drums (2002–2005)
 Tom 'Jangles' Knox
 Joey "Gunner" Hunt
 Austin Hotchkiss
 Harrison Rolfe
 Lance Michael

Discography

Full lengths
 Mediocre Generica - (September 11, 2001)
 Fuck World Trade - (August 31, 2004)
 Constructs of the State - (November 27, 2015)

EPs
 Rock the 40 Oz. - (May 8, 2000)
 Shoot the Kids at School - (2000)

Compilation albums 
 Rock the 40 Oz: Reloaded July 16, 2004
 Leftöver Leftöver Crack: The E-Sides and F-sides,  Fat Wreck Chords, 2018.

Split albums
 Baby Jesus Sliced Up in the Manger (as the Crack Rock Steady 7, with F-Minus), HellBent Records, 2001
 Baby Punchers / Meltdown Split 7-inch (with Citizen Fish), Fat Wreck Chords, 2006
 Deadline (with Citizen Fish), Fat Wreck Chords, March 6, 2007  (LP on Alternative Tentacles)

Music videos
 Rock the 40 Oz. (2002)
 System Fucked (2015)
 Bedbugs and Beyond (2016)

Compilation album contributions
 Give 'Em the Boot II, (Crack City Rockers[Demo]) Hellcat Records, 1999.
 "Punk Rawk Explosion #6" (Nazi White Trash) Punk Rawk, 2001.
 "Eat This!", (Nazi White Trash (Demo?) ), Eat Me! Records, 2001.
 Give 'Em the Boot III, (Atheist Anthem) Hellcat Records, 2002.
 Go Kart vs. the Corporate Giant Vol. 3, (Rock The 40oz) Go Kart Records, 2002.
 Punk Rawk Explosion 6, (Nazi White Trash), ?, 2003.
 2003 Sampler, (So Ya Wanna Be A Cop) A-F Records, 2003.
 Fueling the Flames of Revolution Vol. 3, (One Dead Cop) A-F Records, 2003.
 Against Police Injustice,(Operation:MOVE, Super Tuesday[Demo]) Non Commercial, 2003.
 Mass Destruction, (Muppet N.A.M.B.L.A) BANKSHOT! Records, 2003.
 Riot Ska, (Drug Song, Nobody Is Free) Beer Records, 2004.
 "Breeding Disloyalty", (Operation: M.O.V.E) Household Name Records, 2004.
 The Kids Are Gonna Pay (Look Who's Talking Now) with F-Minus, Morning Glory, Bent Outta Shape, Blacknoise Records, 2006.
 "Rotten Schwuchtel Sampler - A Queer / Pro-Gay Punk & HC-Compilation", (Gay Rude Boys Unite) Not On Label, 2008.
 "Alternative Tentacles", (Gang Control) Pasazer, 2010.
 "Coaster", (Infested (The Lindane Conspiracy Part I) Fat Wreck Chords, 2018.

Live
 2001: Live C-Squat 3/31/01 2002: Straight Outta' Naples 2008: live at the stage @ Arnhem, HollandBootlegs
 2004: Fuck World Trade'' (demo)

Film
 2007: Chris Fuller's Loren Cass (Gotham Award nomination)

See also
 F-Minus
 Choking Victim
 No Commercial Value
 Morning Glory
 C-Squat
 Star Fucking Hipsters

References
Footnotes

Sources
 
 
 
 
 
 Leftöver Crack on Punknews.org.
 Summertime to-do lists - Times-Standard Online
 High school graduates share their views on life

External links
 Official Facebook Page
 Official Myspace Page
 Interview with Stza by Tao Lin (2011)
 10 Questions with Leftöver Crack

Punk rock groups from New York (state)
American ska musical groups
American crust and d-beat groups
Hellcat Records artists
Musical groups established in 1999
Musical groups from New York City
Third-wave ska groups
Fat Wreck Chords artists
Alternative Tentacles artists
Political music groups
1999 establishments in New York City